Ferdinand Strøm (10 June 1903 – 29 November 1990) was a Norwegian dentist, and a pioneer in developing forensic dentistry in Norway. He was born in Kristiania to Ferdinand Gunerius Strøm and Gurine Halvorsen.

References

1903 births
1990 deaths
People from Oslo in health professions
Norwegian dentists
20th-century dentists